Anse-à-Galets Airport is a shoreline airport in Anse-à-Galets, La Gônave, Haiti. This airport is served by charter airlines from Port-au-Prince. Gonâve Island (French: Île de la Gonâve) is an island of Haiti  to the west-northwest of Port-au-Prince in the Gulf of Gonâve.

See also
Transport in Haiti
List of airports in Haiti

References

External links
Anse-a-Galets Airport
OpenStreetMap - Anse-à-Galets

Airports in Haiti